James Lawrence Kuhn (born November 19, 1961) is an American visual artist and professional clown ("Haw Haw the Clown") from Three Oaks, Michigan.  Kuhn is known for his "365 Faces in a Year", in which he painted a different image on his face and head every day for a year.  Kuhn has lent his artistic talents to the Canadian indie rock band Young Rival's video "Two Reasons".

References

External links
 James Kuhn on Myspace
 James Kuhn's art on Flickr
 James Kuhn on Livejournal
 James Kuhn on YouTube
 James Kuhn represented by Crazy 8 Art
 James Kuhn on Life In The Fast Lane
 

American artists
Body art
1961 births
Living people